"Crank It Up" is a song by French DJ and record producer David Guetta, featuring vocals by Senegalese-American R&B recording artist Akon. Taken from the former's fifth studio album, Nothing but the Beat. The song was written by Aliaune Thiam, Guetta, Giorgio Tuinfort and Riesterer. Production was also handled by Guetta, Tuinfort and Rister. On March 14, 2012, Guetta tweeted that he had a dilemma on choosing his next single, asking his fans for opinions, giving two tracks "Crank It Up" and "I Can Only Imagine" featuring Chris Brown and Lil Wayne, but ultimately lost to the latter.

Track listing 
Album version
"Crank It Up" (featuring Akon) – 3:12

Credits and personnel
Credits adapted from the liner notes for Nothing but the Beat.

 David Guetta – songwriting, production, mixing
 Aliaune Thiam – songwriting, lead vocals, production
 Giorgio Tuinfort – songwriting, production
 Frédéric Riesterer – songwriting, production
 Guy Katsav – recording, engineering

Charts

References

David Guetta songs
Akon songs
Songs written by David Guetta
Songs written by Akon
Songs written by Giorgio Tuinfort
Song recordings produced by David Guetta
Songs written by Frédéric Riesterer